Onozuka (written: 小野塚) is a Japanese surname. Notable people with the surname include:

, Japanese freestyle skier
, Japanese actor
, Japanese voice actor

Japanese-language surnames